Qatar Dash (also Romanized as Qaţār Dāsh; also known as Qaţār) is a village in Ajorluy-ye Gharbi Rural District, Baruq District, Miandoab County, West Azerbaijan Province, Iran. At the 2006 census, its population was 105, in 21 families.

References 

Populated places in Miandoab County